Ammonium paratungstate (or APT) is a white crystalline salt with the chemical formula (NH4)10(H2W12O42)·4H2O.  It is described as "the most important raw material for all
other tungsten products."

Production

From tungsten ores
Tungsten ores, which are typically oxides, are digested in base to give solutions of tungstate together with many contaminating species.  This crude extract is acidified and treated with sulfide to separate molybdenum trisulfide.  Upon further acidification APT eventually crystallizes.

Laboratory methods
If a calcined WO3 is used, refluxing the ammonia solution is advisable to accelerate its dissolution.

Conversion to tungsten metal
Heating ammonium paratungstate to its decomposition temperature of 600 °C yields tungsten(VI) oxide, as described in this idealized equation:
(NH4)10(H2W12O42)·4H2O  →  12 WO3  +  10 NH3  + 6 H2O

From there, the trioxide is heated in an atmosphere of hydrogen, yielding elemental tungsten:
WO3  +  3 H2  →  W + 3 H2O

Structure

The anion in (NH4)10(W12O41)·5H2O has been shown to be [H2W12O42]10−, containing two hydrogen atoms, keeping two hydrogen atoms inside the cage. The correct formula notation for ammonium paratungstate is therefore (NH4)10[H2W12O42]·4H2O. The [H2W12O42]10− ion is known as the paratungstate B ion, as opposed to the paratungstate A ion, that has the formula [W7O24]6−, similar to the paramolybdate ion. The existence of the paratungstate A ion, could not be confirmed by NMR spectroscopy, however.

Before about 1930, there has been some dispute about the exact composition of the salt, and both (NH4)10W12O41 and (NH4)6W7O24 were proposed. O.W. Gibbs remarked about this: 
"The alkali tungstates are numerous and unusually complex. Salts of essentially different formulae approach so closely in percentage composition, that the differences lie very near the unavoidable errors of analyses. The analyses are hardly sufficiently close to decide the question upon purely analytical grounds."

Other hydrates
When concentrating an ammoniacal solution of tungstic acid (i.e. hydrous WO3), the product obtained is ammonium paratungstate. Below 50 °C, the hexahydrate is formed, whereas when the temperature of the solution is above 50 °C, the pentahydrate or heptahydrate is formed. The former crystallizes as triclinic plates or prisms, whereas the latter as pseudorhombic needles. The tetrahydrate is most significant in a commercial sense.  Also known:
decahydrate
nonahydrate

References 

Ammonium compounds
Tungstates